Kamel Beldjoud (born in 1957 in Algiers) is an Algerian politician and Minister of Transport. He was appointed as minister on 8 September 2022.

He has held several positions in state institutions since 1982. He was Minister of Housing, Town Planning and the City from March 31 to December 19, 2019, then Minister of the Interior, Local Government and Regional Planning since December 19, 2019.

In August 2022, Beldjoud has responded to the country's widespread wildfires.

Education 
Beldjoud holds a Diploma in Statistical Engineering.

See also 
 Cabinet of Algeria

References

21st-century Algerian people
1957 births
Algerian politicians
Interior ministers of Algeria
Living people
People from Algiers
Transport ministers of Algeria